{{DISPLAYTITLE:C12H15NO3S}}
The molecular formula C12H15NO3S (molar mass: 253.32 g/mol, exact mass: 253.0773 u) may refer to:

 Benzylmercapturic acid
 Thiorphan

Molecular formulas